Bin Quraya Group, through its rental division: BQ Rental, is the leading Mobile Cranes and Heavy Equipment rental firm in Saudi Arabia, with one of the Middle East's largest heavy equipment fleets. The company is based in Dhahran, Saudi Arabia, with clients and projects all over the Kingdom.

History
In 1975 Mr. Awad Bin Quraya and Mr. Sadiq, a Bahrain national, formed a joint venture company known as "ASCO" with a paid up capital of SR. 100,000.00 to pursue small projects on sub-contract basis from the main contractors for Saudi Aramco projects. The hard work and dedication of "ASCO" was soon recognized by Saudi Aramco and it was included in the list of Short Form Contracts for Civil & Mechanical work. At that time the company employed 20-25 workers including the owners and the only equipment the company owned at the time was an old Crane, three Pick-ups trucks and a couple of compressors.

In 1982, Mr. Sadiq decided to quit the partnership and subsequently Bin Quraya Est. Technical Services & General Contracting, a sole proprietorship of Mr. Awad Bin Quraya was established.

In a short period of time the establishment was registered with Saudi Aramco as a Mechanical Contractor. The earliest projects were pipeline contracts and required a number of heavy equipment that had to be rented. Therefore Mr. Awad decided to purchase various types of equipment needed for the projects, simultaneously hiring qualified personnel and using the profits earned from projects for equipment purchase. This resulted in obtaining bigger projects from Saudi Aramco.

The real upswing in business occurred in 1986 when Saudi Aramco's "East West Pipeline Reconditioning Project" at Abqaiq was tendered, and Bin Quraya Est. succeeded in winning Long Form Contracts in the project. Due to project requirements, Bin Quraya Est. procured a sizable inventory of Heavy Equipment especially construction cranes. Currently the Establishment employs 2500 employees and has a fleet of 250 cranes of various capacities and other construction equipment such as wheel loaders, bulldozers, graders, backhoes, pipe-layers (side boom), tractor heads & trailers, dump trucks and other plant equipment.

Divisions
 BQ Rental: Mobile Cranes and Heavy equipment rental
 BQ Build: Construction
 BQ Power: Electric generators rental

Heavy equipment fleet
Bin Quraya possesses one of the largest heavy equipment fleets in the middle east, with over 500 construction cranes, in capacities ranging from 20 to 800 tonnes, and more than that number in various other heavy equipment.

Bin Qurayas fleet includes cranes from the following manufacturers:
Liebherr
Tadano
Mercedes Benz
Volvo
Toyota
The Manitowoc Company (formerly Grove Cranes)
Caterpillar Inc.

Major clients
Saudi Aramco
Weatherford
Shell
Halliburton
SABIC
Total S.A.
Schlumberger
Saudi Electricity Company
Bin Laden Group
Petro Rabigh
SATORP
SINOPEC
Marafiq
Saipem
Royal Commission for Jubail and Yanbu
BAKER HUGHES SAUDI ARABIA CO.
DRILLING PETROLEUM SERVICES
RABIGH REFINING & PETROCHEMICAL
SAUDI CEMENT COMPANY
ZAMIL GROUP HOLDING COMPANY

External links
Official website
BQ Rental website

References

Business services companies established in 1975
Construction equipment rental companies
Construction and civil engineering companies of Saudi Arabia
Construction and civil engineering companies established in 1975
Saudi Arabian companies established in 1975